Moretti may refer to:

 Moretti (surname), Italian surname

Characters
Junk Moretti, a character in One Tree Hill
Kevin Moretti, a character on the television series E.R.
Melanie Moretti, Valerie Bertinelli's character on Hot in Cleveland
Tony Moretti, a character in the Nine Network's 2008 action drama series The Strip, played by Bob Morley
Victoria "Vic" Moretti, a character in the Longmire novels and television series

Brands and enterprises
Birra Moretti, Italian beer brand owned by Heineken International
Birra Moretti Cup, football tournament
Moretti glass, another term for what is now called Effetre glass
Moretti Motor Company, defunct Italian automobile maker